Adolphus Grimes (July 6, 1913 – February 6, 1998) was an American Negro league outfielder in the 1940s.

A native of Greensboro, Georgia, Grimes played for the Cleveland Buckeyes and the Atlanta Black Crackers in 1943, and played for Atlanta again the following season. In five recorded games, he posted four hits in 19 plate appearances. Grimes died in Atlanta, Georgia in 1998 at age 84.

References

External links
 and Seamheads

1913 births
1998 deaths
Atlanta Black Crackers players
Cleveland Buckeyes players
20th-century African-American sportspeople